Brezna is a village in the municipality of Kraljevo, western-central Serbia. According to the 2002 census, the village has a population of 104 people. PSD Gvozdac Mountain home "Zorica Gizdavić" is located in village of Brezna

References

Populated places in Raška District